Bang Your Head may refer to:

 "Bang Your Head" (song) or "Metal Health", a song by Quiet Riot
 "Bang Your Head", a song by Milla from The Divine Comedy
 Bang Your Head!!!, a metal festival in Balingen, Germany